Uroballus peckhami is a spider species of the jumping spider family, Salticidae that is known only from northern Vietnam (Ha Noi).

This species is known only from a single female.

Description
The general body form is like those of other species in the genus. The carapace is dark orange. On the blackish eye area there are two dark spots. There are many white hairs on the sides. The abdomen is light grey with a dark grey spine-like pattern followed by chevrons. The legs are yellow with grey rings near the joints. The long spinnerets are also grey.

Name
The species is named after arachnologists George and Elizabeth Peckham.

Footnotes

References
  (2000): An Introduction to the Spiders of South East Asia. Malaysian Nature Society, Kuala Lumpur.
  (2007): The world spider catalog, version 8.0. American Museum of Natural History.

Salticidae
Arthropods of Vietnam
Spiders of Asia
Spiders described in 1985